Sergio Souza, full name Sergio Sebastián Souza Pisano (born May 7, 1985 in Montevideo), is a Uruguayan professional footballer who plays as an attacking midfielder or striker.

Career
On 26 June 2012, he was transferred to Ecuadorian side Centro Deportivo Olmedo.

Honours
Central Español
Uruguayan Segunda División: 2011–12

References

External links
 Profile at Soccerway
 Official Website
 Stats at Footballdatabase

1985 births
Living people
Uruguayan footballers
Uruguayan expatriate footballers
Uruguayan Primera División players
Montevideo Wanderers F.C. players
Club Atlético River Plate (Montevideo) players
Central Español players
C.D. Olmedo footballers
C.D. Técnico Universitario footballers
Expatriate footballers in Ecuador
Association football midfielders